Villanova, in Benasquese: Bilanoba or Billanoba, in Catalan: Vilanova d'Éssera, in Aragonese: Vilanova, is a municipality located in the Ribagorza comarca, province of Huesca, Aragon, Spain. According to the 2010 census (INE), the municipality has a population of 154 inhabitants.

The town is located at the foot of the Sierra de Chía range. There are yearly religious celebrations on April 29 in honor of Saint Peter Martyr.

See also
Ésera/Éssera River

References

External links 
 CAI Aragon

Ribagorza